Shin Eun-mi is a Korean-American classical singer and writer who travelled to North Korea several times over 2011 to 2012. She wrote a book on her experiences travelling to North Korea, which South Korea's Ministry of Culture, Sports and Tourism named a "recommended book" in 2013. She gave a series of lectures in South Korea on the topic of her travels to North Korea. Her lectures, originally given a positive reception, later became locations of demonstrations by far-right conservatives. Shin Eun-mi was deported from South Korea on 10 January 2015.

Shin Eun-mi's book is titled A Korean American Housewife Goes to North Korea. The book is a compilation of her travel diaries while traveling North Korea.

A documentary "To Kill Alice" was made about Shin Eun-mi's experience of being deported from South Korea. The film was made by director Kim Sang-kyu.

References

Notes 

Year of birth missing (living people)
Living people
Deported people
American people of Korean descent